The CECAFA Nile Basin Cup, also known as the CECAFA Nile Basin Winners' Cup, is a football club tournament organised by CECAFA that is contested by clubs from East and Central Africa. The creation of the tournament was announced in May 2014, with the inaugural edition taking place in Sudan between 23 May and 4 June 2014.

Previous winners

Finals

Winners and runners-up

By nation

See also
 CECAFA Club Cup
 CECAFA Cup

References

 
CECAFA competitions
International club association football competitions in Africa